The Remnant is a Traditionalist Catholic newspaper published twice a month in the United States. Although its editors are not affiliated with any particular institute or traditionalist group, the paper is sympathetic to Archbishop Marcel Lefebvre and the Society of St. Pius X. Founded in 1968, it is the oldest Traditionalist Catholic newspaper in the United States. 

The Remnant claims to adhere to Catholic teaching in every aspect of its journalism. The name The Remnant is a reference to the remnant of Isaiah and to the belief that only a remnant of Catholics holding to the traditional teachings and practice of the Church remain after the sweeping changes brought by the Second Vatican Council.

History
The Remnant traces its roots back to The Wanderer, the "parent paper" of The Remnant and the oldest Catholic weekly newspaper in the United States. The Remnant was a result of a dispute between Walter Matt, the editor of The Wanderer who served the paper for over thirty years, and his brother Alphonse Matt. Walter Matt opposed the changes within the Catholic Church after the Second Vatican Council; Alphonse Matt supported them.

Walter Matt left The Wanderer, which remained under Alphonse, to start The Remnant in 1967. The paper has described itself as the flagship of the traditional Catholic movement in the United States.

The Remnant is now edited by Walter Matt's youngest son, Michael J. Matt. Notable traditionalists who have written for the paper include Thomas Woods, Christopher Ferrara, John C. Rao, and Michael Davies.  From 2005 to 2013, The Remnant was a very vigorous defender of the pontificate of Benedict XVI as its writers believe he has vindicated them on issues that have divided them from other Traditionalists and from conservative Catholics associated with The Wanderer, EWTN, Church Militant and Catholic Answers. Under the current pontificate of Pope Francis, the newspaper has heavily criticized his policies.

Additional projects 
 After producing daily video updates from Rome after the resignation of Pope Benedict XVI and the conclave which ultimately elected Pope Francis, The Remnant began producing  video commentary and events coverage under the title of Remnant TV. Remnant TV releases weekly talk show styled YouTube videos in three series: Remnant TV Forum, Remnant Special Report, and The Remnant Underground. Michael Matt is the host and principal commentator; regular guests include contributors to the Remnant, and other Catholic commentators.  
 The Remnant has hosted and organized tours and pilgrimages to the Holy Land and throughout Europe under the name "Remnant Tours". It has also organized the United States Chapter of the three-day Chartres Pilgrimage, a seventy-mile walking pilgrimage from Paris to Chartres during Pentecost weekend.
 Remnant Press publishes Traditionalist Catholic works, such as Dietrich von Hildebrand.

Positions
Catholic apologist Dave Armstrong has described The Remnant as "radical Catholic reactionary."

The Southern Poverty Law Center have labeled The Remnant and the Remnant Press as "hate groups" under a category they describe as "Radical Traditionalist Catholic", which the SPLC defines as "organizations that embrace anti-Semitism and whose theology is typically rejected by the Vatican and mainstream Catholics in general."

References

External links
 Official site
 Remnant TV

Publications established in 1967
Traditionalist Catholic newspapers
Catholic newspapers published in the United States
Conservative media in the United States
Right-wing politics in the United States